Hippodamia variegata, the Adonis ladybird, also known as the variegated ladybug (US) and spotted amber ladybeetle (Aus), is a species of ladybeetle belonging to the family Coccinellidae, subfamily Coccinellinae.

Habitat and distribution
This species is native in the Palearctic, but has also spread to the Nearctic and Oriental region. It has been found outside its native range countries such as Australia, South Africa, Kenya, India, China, Canada, the United States, and Chile, often through intended introduction to control crop pests.

This species mainly inhabits fields, meadows, gardens and shrubs, more than bushes and trees. It prefers dry, rough vegetation.

Identification
These beetles have a slightly convex and rather elongated body. The first segment of the anterior legs of males is greatly expanded. Head is black, with dark eyes and white spots. Pronotum is black, with a white-yellowish border and a central black mask shaped marking. Elytra are red or orange, with a very variable number of black points (from zero up to thirteen). One black spot surrounded by white is located on the scutellum. The legs are blackish brown, with brown ends. The underside of the body is black.

References

Coccinellidae
Beetles of Europe
Beetles described in 1777
Taxa named by Johann August Ephraim Goeze